Edwin Maanane (born 3 February 1995) is a French professional footballer who plays for Bourges, as a forward.

Professional career
Maanane was part of the AJ Auxerre youth academy, and moved to Stade de Reims in 2013. Maanane made his professional debut for Reims in a 1–1 Ligue 1 tie with OGC Nice on 12 December 2015. He joined Grenoble Foot 38 in 2016 and was the top scorer for the team in his debut season, scoring 19 goals. He helped the club win back-to-back promotions from the fourth tier to Ligue 2.

Maanane left Grenoble to join Avranches on loan in January 2019. On 17 June 2019, he joined Rodez AF in Ligue 2 on a free transfer.

In July 2020 Maanane returned to the Championnat National with US Concarneau, signing a two-year deal with an optional release at the end of the first year.

On 7 July 2022, Maanane joined Bourges.

Personal life
Born in France, Maanane is of Algerian descent.

References

External links
 
 GF38 Profile
 

1995 births
Living people
People from Saint-Priest-en-Jarez
Sportspeople from Loire (department)
French footballers
French sportspeople of Algerian descent
Association football forwards
Grenoble Foot 38 players
Stade de Reims players
US Avranches players
Rodez AF players
US Concarneau players
Bourges Foot 18 players
Ligue 1 players
Ligue 2 players
Championnat National players
Championnat National 2 players
Championnat National 3 players
Footballers from Auvergne-Rhône-Alpes